Blakeney is a village in Gloucestershire, England. It in the parish of Awre and has views of the Forest of Dean.

It was the site of a Roman villa, dating to 75 AD, and home to Thomas Sternhold, a groom of King Henry VIII's Robes.

The local manor house is Hayes Manor, Viney Hill. Hawfield House on Newnham Road was built c. 1790.

Governance
The parish lies in the Awre electoral ward, which includes the village of Awre and Blakeney. The population at the 2011 census was 1,714.

References

External links 

photos of Blakeney and surrounding area on geograph
Victoria County History of Gloucestershire: Awre

Villages in Gloucestershire
Awre